Mario Mangiarotti (Renate, 12 July 1920 – Bergamo, 10 June 2019) was an Italian fencer and sports manager, winner of a silver medal at the 1951 World Fencing Championships in Stockholm.

Biography
Born in Renate, he was the son of the Olympic champion Giuseppe Mangiarotti and brother of the fencers Dario Mangiarotti and Edoardo Mangiarotti.

Having abandoned his competitive activity, he began his medical career as a cardiologist.

He was also president of the CONI of Bergamo, where he died on 10 June 2019, aged 98.

References

1920 births
2019 deaths
Italian cardiologists
Italian male fencers
Mangiarotti family
Sportspeople from the Province of Monza e Brianza